Ancula kariyana is a species of sea slug, a dorid nudibranch, a marine gastropod mollusc in the family Goniodorididae.

Distribution
This species was first described from Japan.

Description
This goniodorid nudibranch is translucent white in colour with brown spots and patches. The pre-rhinophoral papillae and gills are tipped with yellow and there is a line of white pigment with diffuse edges along the ridge of the tail. The front of the rhinophores is brown and the tips are white. There are two long extra-branchial papillae which are translucent white with some yellow and brown streaks on their upper surfaces.

Ecology
Ancula kariyana probably feeds on Entoprocta which often grow on hydroids, bryozoa and other living substrata.

References

Goniodorididae
Gastropods described in 1990